El Tecolote (from the Nahuatl tecolotl, "owl") may refer to:

El Tecolote, Baja California Sur, Mexico
El Tecolote, Guanajuato, Mexico
El Tecolote (newspaper), U.S.